
Year 472 (CDLXXII) was a leap year starting on Saturday (link will display the full calendar) of the Julian calendar. At the time, it was known as the Year of the Consulship of Festus and Marcianus (or, less frequently, year 1225 Ab urbe condita). The denomination 472 for this year has been used since the early medieval period, when the Anno Domini calendar era became the prevalent method in Europe for naming years.

Events 
 By place 
 Roman Empire 
 The Western Roman Empire enters a period of unrest. Relations between Ricimer, de facto ruler, and Emperor Anthemius deteriorate completely. Epiphanius, bishop of Pavia, negotiates a peace agreement.  
 July 11 – Anthemius, besieged in the part of Rome he controls until his troops are defeated, is caught while fleeing the city disguised as a supplicant in the Old St. Peter's Basilica (or at the church of Santa Maria in Trastevere), and later beheaded by Gundobad or Ricimer. Ricimer proclaims Olybrius emperor. Ricimer's nephew, the Burgundian general Gundobad, assumes command of the Western army and holds de facto power in the Empire.
 August 18 – Ricimer dies at his palace of malignant fever, vomiting blood.
 November 2 – Olybrius dies of dropsy. During his four months' rule he has been mainly interested in religion. 
 Mount Vesuvius erupts. During the volcanic eruption the whole of southern Europe is blanketed by ash.

Births 
 Emilian of Cogolla, Iberic abbot and saint (approximate date)

Deaths 
 July 11 – Anthemius, emperor of the Western Roman Empire
 August 18 – Ricimer, de facto ruler of the Western Roman Empire
 Ming Di, Chinese emperor of the Liu Song Dynasty (b. 439)
 Olybrius, emperor of the Western Roman Empire

References